The following is a timeline of the history of the city of Sofia, Bulgaria.

Prior to 14th century

 2nd C. CE – Serdica founded by Trajan.
 268 CE – Serdica raided by Goths.
 343 CE – Council of Serdica convenes (approximate date).
 4th C.
 Church of St. George  
 Amphitheatre of Serdica built (approximate date).
 Saint Sophia Church, Sofia originates.
 447 – Town burned by Huns.
 809 - 
 Town becomes part of Bulgarian Empire.
 Town renamed "Sredetz."
 987 - Successful resistance to the attacks of the emperor Basil II.
 11th C. – Boyana Church built near town (approximate date).
 1194
 Town becomes part of Byzantium.
 Town renamed "Triaditsa" (approximate date).

14th–18th centuries
 13th C. – Church of St. Nicholas built.
 1329 – Town renamed "Sofia."
 1382 – Ottomans take Sofia.
 1443 – Town occupied briefly by Hungarian forces under John Hunyadi.
 1493 – Kremikovtsi Monastery reestablished near Sofia.
 1494 –  built.
 1528 – Black Mosque built.
 1576 – Banya Bashi Mosque built.
 1610 – Catholic See of Sophia established.

19th century
 1818 – Earthquake.
 1829 – Town occupied by Russian forces.
 1858 – Earthquake.
 1863 – St Nedelya Church rebuilt.
 1878 – Town liberated by Russian forces.
 1879
 Capital of Bulgaria relocated to Sofia from Veliko Tarnovo.
 Area of city: 3 square kilometers.
 1881 – Population: 20,501.
 1882 – Royal palace built.
 1884 – Boris' Garden (park) laid out.
 1886 – National Assembly building constructed.
 1888
 Sofia University founded.
 Sofia Central Station and Sofia Zoo open.
 Dimitar Petkov becomes mayor.
 1890 – 31 May: "Destructive thunderstorm."
 1891 – Eagles' Bridge and Lions' Bridge built.
 1893
 Bulgarian Literary Society relocates to Sofia.
 Population: 46,593.
 1897 – Battenberg Mausoleum erected.
 1898 – Central Hunters' Society headquartered in Sofia.

20th century

 1903
 Bulgarian Social Democratic Workers' Party (Narrow Socialists) headquartered in Sofia.
 Sveti Sedmochislenitsi Church inaugurated.
 1904 – National Theatre founded.
 1905 – National Archaeological Museum opens.
 1907
 Central Military Club built.
 Population: 82,187.
 The Monument to the Tsar Liberator was inaugurated on Tsar Osvoboditel Boulevard in Sofia
 1908
 Bulgarian Opera Society established.
 City becomes capital of the Kingdom of Bulgaria.
 1909 – Sofia Synagogue built.
 1910 – Population: 102,812.
 1911
 Central Sofia Market Hall opens.
 Union of Bulgarian Chitalishta headquartered in Sofia.
 1912 – Alexander Nevsky Cathedral built.
 1913 – L'écho de Bulgarie newspaper begins publication.
 1914
 Levski Sofia (sports club) founded.
 Russian Church consecrated.
 Vrana Palace built near Sofia.
 1919 – Simplon Orient Express (Paris–Sofia) begins operating.
 1922 – National Opera established.
 1925
 16 April: St Nedelya Church assault.
 Thracian student society founded.
 1926 – Vladimir Vazov becomes mayor.
 1927 – Kino Vlaikova (cinema) established (approximate date).
 1929 – Ivan Vazov National Theatre rebuilt.
 1930 – Church of St Paraskeva built.
 1934
 City becomes seat of Sofia Oblast.
 Population: 287,095; department 1,152,053.
 French Institute built on Slaveykov Square.
 1939
 Bulgarian National Bank built.
 Area of city: 42 square kilometers.
 1940 – Sofia Court House built on Vitosha Boulevard.
 1943 – Bombing of Sofia in World War II by Allied forces.
 1944 – Bombing of Sofia in World War II by Allied forces.
 1946 – City becomes capital of the People's Republic of Bulgaria.
 1949 – Sofia Power Plant commissioned.
 1951 – Vecherni Novini newspaper begins publication.
 1953 – Vasil Levski National Stadium and National Opera and Ballet building open.
 1955 – Communist Party Centre built.
 1956 – Park Hotel Moskva built.
 1959 – Borisova Gradina TV Tower erected.
 1962 – Boyana Film studio established.
 1963 – Georgi Asparuhov Stadium opens.
 1964 – Population: 739,200 urban agglomeration.
 1965 – Theatre 199 founded.
 1968 – City hosts World Festival of Youth and Students.
 1974 – Sofia Central Station rebuilt.
 1976 – Hemus Hotel built.
 1977 – Princess Hotel Sofia built.
 1978 – CITUB Administrative Building built.
 1979 – Hotel Rodina and Vitosha New Otani (hotel) built.
 1981 – National Palace of Culture opens.
 1984 – Population: 1,097,791 (estimate).
 1991
 New Bulgarian University and Higher Islamic Institute established.
 Aleksandar Yanchulev becomes mayor.
 Odeon Cinema active.
 1993 – June: Union of Democratic Forces demonstration.
 1995 – Stefan Sofiyanski becomes mayor.
 1997
 January: .
 Sofia Film Festival begins.
 1998 – Sofia Metro begins operating.

21st century

 2001
 November: Protest.
 Iceberg Sofia hockey team formed.
 2003
 Radio Nova begins broadcasting.
 City plan "Sofia 2020" adopted.
 2004 – Central Bus Station Sofia opens.
 2005
 Boyko Borisov becomes mayor.
  landfill protest.
 2006
 Mall of Sofia in business.
 Kino Cineplex opens.
 Cathedral of St Joseph rebuilt.
 2007
 Olympia Sofia women's football club established.
 Bulgaria becomes part of the European Union.
 2008
 Sofia Pride begins.
 3 July: 2008 Chelopechene explosions.
 2009
 Sofia Middle East & North Africa Film Festival begins.
 Yordanka Fandakova becomes mayor.
 Benchmark Tower built.
 2011
 September: Anti-Roma demonstration.
 Armeets Arena and Sofia Arsenal Museum of Contemporary Art opens.
 Sopharma Business Center towers built.
 2012
 Line 2 of Sofia Metro began operation.
 Population: 1,241,396.
 2013
 February: Protest against the Borisov cabinet.
 June: Protest against the Oresharski cabinet.
2015 – Capital Fort became the tallest building in Sofia with its 126 meters (413 ft).
2017 – Millennium Center was completed.
2020 – Sofia Metro Line 3 is set to open.

See also
 History of Sofia
 List of mayors of Sofia
 Timelines of other cities in Bulgaria: Plovdiv,  Varna
 List of the oldest buildings in Sofia

References

This article incorporates information from the Bulgarian Wikipedia.

Bibliography

External links

 Europeana. Items related to Sofia, various dates.
 Digital Public Library of America. Items related to Sofia, various dates

 
Sofia
Sofia-related lists
sofia
Years in Bulgaria
Sofia
Bulgaria history-related lists